Paul O'Flynn (born 12 January 1985) is an Irish television reporter for RTÉ News and Current Affairs.

O'Flynn often uses creative means to tell his stories to viewers, such as slurping noodles for a broadcast during the 2019 Rugby World Cup. He was filmed diving into the sea at Sandycove's Forty Foot on 20 May 2020 in a news report about government COVID-19 pandemic restrictions on public swimming being eased, with the footage being broadcast at 1 pm that afternoon then being pulled when Dún Laoghaire–Rathdown County Council told RTÉ it was "promoting a prohibited act".

O'Flynn has been involved in swimming since he was four years of age, won the 2018 Liffey Swim and is also a water polo enthusiast. He has membership of the Half Moon Swimming Club.

He is married to Mary Regan, who also works for RTÉ.

References

Irish male swimmers
Irish male water polo players
RTÉ newsreaders and journalists
21st-century Irish people
Living people
1985 births